PAS-6 was a communications satellite owned by PanAmSat and serving the South America market.

Satellite description 
PAS-6 was constructed by Space Systems/Loral, based on the LS-1300 satellite bus. Designed for an operational life of 15 years, the spacecraft was equipped with 36 Ku-band transponders.

Launch 
Arianespace launched PAS-6, using an Ariane 4 launch vehicle, flight number V98, in the Ariane 44P H10-3 configuration. The launch took place from ELA-2 at the Centre Spatial Guyanais, at Kourou in French Guiana, on 8 August 1997, at 06:46:00 UTC.

Decommissioning 
On 17 March 2004, PAS-6 suffered an anomaly resulting in a loss of power. Then PanAmSat moved the satellite to a storage orbit while the PanAmSat and SS/L evaluated the problem. On 1 April 2004, this satellite experienced another anomaly and more significant loss of power. PAS-6 was put in graveyard orbit.

References 

Communications satellites in geostationary orbit
Satellites using the SSL 1300 bus
Satellite television
Spacecraft launched in 1997